The Oshkosh All-Stars were an American professional basketball team based in Oshkosh, Wisconsin. Founded in 1929 by Lonnie Darling, the team was a member of the National Basketball League, a forerunner to the NBA, from 1937 until 1949.

History 
The team began as a barnstorming team, playing loosely structured games against other Wisconsin-based teams. It did not belong to a league.

Sports editor of the Oshkosh Daily Northwestern, Arthur Heywood, thought Oshkosh should have a professional basketball team to give people something to talk about over the winter months. Heywood took the idea to Lonnie Darling, a seed distributor and salesman for the G. H. Hunkel Co. Although Darling had never played a game of basketball in his life, he agreed and recruited 30 talented local players to try out.

The team had no set roster, and players could switch allegiances from night to night.  Players could make from $15 to $25 per game and played almost every day of the week.  The All-Stars played their games at the Recreation Gym to crowds of 800 to 1,200 people.

The rules of the game made it impossible for high scoring. After every basket, the ball went back to mid-court for a center jump, and the clock continued non-stop. Fans wanted to see action, so the officials let players scramble and hit each other without much interference.  Fan involvement was direct; when a questionable call was made or an opposing player made a nasty move, fans would storm onto the court in an angry mob. In this time, there were designated shooters so that the same player would shoot for every free throw.

National Basketball League 
The all-white Oshkosh All-Stars played the all-black New York Renaissance Big Five (Rens) for the first time in February 1936 in a two-game series. The series drew such a large crowd that team manager Darling decided to play the Rens again in 1937 in a five-game series. The games were held in Oshkosh, Racine, Green Bay, Ripon, and Madison, Wisconsin. Darling declared that the winner of the series would be considered the world's champions of basketball.

The All-Stars lost the series, three games to two, but Robert Douglas, the Ren's owner, agreed to playing an additional two-game series that would extend the "World series" to seven games. If the All-Stars won those two games, they would be considered the world's basketball champions, winning four games to three. The All-Stars defeated the Rens in both games. The following season the NBL added Oshkosh as a founding member.

The team was a part of the NBL for 12 years, starting in 1937 and ending in 1949. During this time, the All-Stars made it to the playoffs 11 of the 12 years, appeared in the NBL championship five consecutive years (1938–1942), and won the NBL Championship twice, in 1941 and 1942.  The All-Stars also won the 1942 World Professional Basketball Tournament over the Detroit Eagles in Chicago. By the late 1940s, after a few unsuccessful seasons, the All-Stars were still a winning team, and Oshkosh was widely known as a "basketball city".

Leroy Edwards holds the team scoring record with 3,221 career points followed by Gene England with 2,600 points. Edwards was awarded Most valuable player of the NBL for three consecutive seasons (1937–1939)

Concluding the All-Stars 
In 1949, the National Basketball League merged with the Basketball Association of America (BAA), forming the National Basketball Association (NBA). The owner died and the team was dissolved.

12-Season record 

Asterisk (*) indicates a playoff appearance

Images

References

External links
Oshkosh All-stars Complete History at NBAhoopsonline
Oshkosh All-Stars seasons at basketball-reference.com

 
1929 establishments in Wisconsin
Basketball teams established in 1929
Basketball teams disestablished in 1949
Basketball teams in Wisconsin
Sports in Oshkosh, Wisconsin
1949 disestablishments in Wisconsin